Long Busang also known as Kampung Long Busang (Lobus) is a village in a rural area located in Bukit Mabong, Sarawak, Malaysia (former was under Belaga distric). It is a village in the Ulu Sungai Balui and dominated by the Kenyah Badeng people.

Long Busang is accessible by boat, car and helicopter. It took a long hours to reach the village and slightly more than 5 hours from the capital of Kapit or Bakun Dam.

Culture and economy 
Celebration of harvest festival (called as Rame O'o Ajau or Rame Lepa Ajau) will be celebrate at the head-leader verandah (Osey Bi'o). Normally they will dance (kancet) and give speech (pekato') in the ceremony. Now, they have two head-leader in the result of increasing population. 

As a Badeng's tribe, the locals here participate in KEBANA festival also known as Kenyah Badeng National Association, an association that unites the Kenyah Badeng tribe in Sarawak. It has been celebrated every year according to the place chosen by the association. The last time Long Busang is the host was in 2014. 

Most of the people in Long Busang work as farmer. In order to support their living expenses, they tend to do different kind of jobs.

Languages 
Majority of the village population speak in Kenyah Badeng. Other languages such as Kenyah Bakung, Kenyah Lepo' Tau, Iban, Indonesia and Malay also wide spoken. Most of them are multilingual since kid.

Religion 
The traditional religion have no longer practises in Long Busang. Before Long Busang is founded, most of them are already practice Christianity. But, it is believed that there's still a small number who practice the Bungan faith.

Like other Kenyah's village, majority of the Kenyah people are Christian while other practice Islam. Respective religion are free to hold their processions in the village. Long Busang church (BEM Long Busang) is located at Oma' Daya (upstream) while the mosque located at the Oma' Aba'(downstream).

Utilities

Education 
 SK Long Busang

Healthcare 
 Klinik Long Busang

References 

Villages in Sarawak